Talbot Lanham Jennings (August 25, 1894 – May 30, 1985) was an American playwright and screenwriter. He received two Academy Award nominations for co-writing the screenplays for Mutiny on the Bounty (1935) and Anna and the King of Siam (1946).

Biography
He was born in 1894 in Shoshone, Idaho, his father was an Episcopal archdeacon  for Idaho and Wyoming. He attended Nampa High School before World War I in which he saw active service.

After to war he went to University of Idaho and graduated Phi Beta Kappa in 1924. He was president of the Associated Students and wrote Light on the Mountains, a state history set to music. He also edited the yearbook, Gem of the Mountains, and the Blue Bucket, the English Department literary publication .

Jennings did a master's degree at Harvard University, then attended Yale Drama School.

Talbot wrote and co-wrote 17 screenplays including Mutiny on the Bounty, Romeo and Juliet, Anna and the King of Siam, Knights of the Round Table, The Good Earth and Northwest Passage. He wrote many screenplays for television also. A story he wrote became The Sons of Katie Elder (1965), and was his last film.

In the 1940 B-movie The Devil's Pipeline, Richard Arlen and Andy Devine play characters named Talbot and Jennings,  apparently an inside joke by one of its writers.

He died at East Glacier Park, Montana.

Plays
No More Frontier (1931)
This Side of Idolatry (1933)

Films
We Live Again (1934) (uncredited)
Mutiny on the Bounty (1935)
Romeo and Juliet (1936)
The Good Earth (1936)
Conquest (1937)
Marie Antoinette (1938) – uncredited
Spawn of the North (1938) – uncredited
Rulers of the Sea (1939)
Northwest Passage (1940)
Edison, the Man (1940)
So Ends Our Night (1941)
Ten Gentlemen from West Point (1942) – uncredited
Frenchman's Creek (1944)
Anna and the King of Siam (1946)
Landfall (1949)
The Black Rose (1950)
Across the Wide Missouri (1951)
Scaramouche (1952)
Knights of the Round Table (1953)
Untamed (1955)
Escape to Burma (1955)
Pearl of the South Pacific (1955)
Gunsight Ridge (1957)
The Naked Maja (1958)
77 Sunset Strip (1959) – "Abra-Cadaver"
The Alaskans (1959) – "Starvation Stampede", "Winter Song"
Adventures in Paradise (1960) – "The Siege of Troy"
The Roaring '20s (1960) – "Among the Missing"
The Sons of Katie Elder (1965) (written in 1965)

References

External links

1894 births
1985 deaths
American male screenwriters
American male dramatists and playwrights
20th-century American male writers
20th-century American dramatists and playwrights
University of Idaho alumni
Harvard University alumni
Yale School of Drama alumni
Screenwriters from Idaho
People from Shoshone, Idaho
American military personnel of World War I
20th-century American screenwriters